Andy Chui Chi-kin is a member of the Eastern District Council, representing Yue Wan constituency in Hong Kong.

Chui is a trader by occupation and participated in the 79-day Occupy sit-ins in 2014. Inspired by the Occupy movement, he formed a group called “umbrella fathers and mothers” with other protesters and ran in the 2015 Hong Kong district council elections against long-term incumbent Christopher Chung Shu-kun, who was also the member of the Legislative Council of Hong Kong for the Democratic Alliance for the Betterment and Progress of Hong Kong, the largest Beijing-loyalist party in Hong Kong, in Yue Wan, his home of more than two decades. He remained unknown to the media until he beat Chung by 2,017 votes to 1,826, a "miracle" portrayed by the media. Chui successfully defended his seat in the 
2019 Hong Kong district council elections, winning with 3,814 votes over DAB (FTU) candidate Lau Kin, who scored 2,374 votes.

Arrests
On 28 June 2020, Chui stated on his Facebook page that he had been among those arrested during protests against the looming National Security Legislation.

On 8 December 2020, Chui was arrested for his alleged involvement in the unauthorized 1 July march that year. Seven other democrats were arrested the same day on similar charges.

On 6 January 2021, Chui was among 53 members of the pro-democratic camp who were arrested under the national security law, specifically its provision regarding alleged subversion. The group stood accused of the organisation of and participation in unofficial primary elections held by the camp in July 2020. Chui was released on bail on 7 January.

See also
 Umbrella Movement

References

External links 
 

1967 births
Living people
District councillors of Eastern District
Alumni of the Hong Kong Polytechnic University
Hong Kong political prisoners